Lloseta is a small municipality in the district of Raiguer on Majorca, one of the Balearic Islands, Spain.There is a theatre which showcases alternative music and traditional acts.  Olympic cyclist Miguel Martorell was born here.

References

Municipalities in Mallorca
Populated places in Mallorca